The effects of Hurricane Irma in the British Virgin Islands were significant in terms of both human and socio-economic impact on the Territory. Hurricane Irma struck the British Virgin Islands as a Category 5 hurricane during the daylight hours of Wednesday, 6 September 2017. It caused widespread destruction, and killed a total of four people. The eye of the hurricane traveled over the three major islands in the group: Virgin Gorda, Tortola and Jost Van Dyke.

The hurricane caused extensive damage to property and infrastructure in the Territory, and caused statistically significant levels of depopulation.

The Governor, Gus Jaspert, who had only been sworn in a few days previously, declared a state of emergency under the Territory's constitution, the first time this had ever happened. As radio facilities had been significantly damaged and were inoperable, the state of emergency had to be announced by distribution of flyers around the capital, Road Town.

Preparations

From a relatively early stage of its development, Hurricane Irma was predicted to travel close to, or over, the British Virgin Islands. However, the late stage intensification of the storm was less well anticipated. As little as two days before the storm struck, the BVI Department of Disaster Management were predicting maximum expected wind speed of  - on the boundary between a Category 2 and Category 3 hurricane. Over the course of 5 September 2017 Hurricane Irma rapidly intensified until it had strengthened well beyond sustained wind speeds required for classification as a Category 5 hurricane, into the strongest hurricane ever recorded over the open Atlantic Ocean (excluding the Gulf of Mexico and Caribbean Sea).

On 5 September 2017 the hurricane's track was predicted to take it directly over the northernmost island in the Territory, Anegada. During the last 24 hours before the storm struck its tracked moved slightly southward so that the centre of the hurricane travelled directly through the middle of the islands.

The Government recommended a full evacuation of Anegada, as the highest elevation on that island is just 25 feet - lower than the predicted storm surge - and the hurricane was expected to pass directly over it. Government provided an evacuation ferry, although not all residents did leave. Ironically, because of the storm's late southward turn, Anegada was spared the worst of the weather.

6 September 2017

At approximately 4.30am local time public electricity was switched off. Standard operating procedure for the British Virgin Islands Electricity Corporate is to shut off power once the majority of the Territory is experiencing tropical storm force winds. By approximately 9.30am the majority of the country was experiencing hurricane-force winds. By the time the storm hit the British Virgin Islands, it had intensified to such a level as to be detected on seismometers calibrated for earthquakes. The eye of the hurricane traversed the Territory between around 1.00 and 2.30 pm. By the early evening wind speeds had fallen once again to sub-hurricane speeds, although tropical storm force winds continued until the small hours of the following morning.

A series of public alert messages sent in SMS form by the Department of Disaster of Management throughout the day, and were recorded in The Irma Diaries, a book recording experiences of survivors from the storm and its aftermath. At 5.39am a message was sent:

The last message from the DDM which was sent before total communications failure was sent at 11.34am read:

No further communications were sent. It would later transpire that the offices of the Department of Disaster Management were almost entirely destroyed during the storm.

In the aftermath of the storm a large proportion of the Territory's roads were impassable. Communities were essentially cut-off from each other and the wider world. Telecommunications was rendered virtually non-existent by the destruction of the cellular telephone network and the almost total loss of telephone poles for landlines.

Deaths

Four people died in the Territory as a result of the hurricane. Their names were Charles Thomas, Derek Ragnauth, Xavier 'Dag' Samuels and Richard Alan Benson.

Dag Samuels was a well known athletics coach in the Territory. His protégé, Kyron McMaster, would go on to win gold in the 400m hurdles in the 2018 Commonwealth Games the following year, and would dedicate his victory to his deceased coach.

The Territory also experienced an abnormally high number of deaths in the months of September to December 2017, after the passage of the hurricane.

Damage

The most significant damage was on Tortola. The UK's Foreign Secretary Boris Johnson visited Tortola on 13 September 2017 and said that he was reminded of photos of Hiroshima after it had been hit by the atom bomb. Real estate investor Joe Chapman said of the hurricane that it was, "incredibly devastating to have your properties damaged..but not only that, the country was destroyed." Approximately 85% of housing stock - over 4,000 homes - were damaged or destroyed. Numerous contemporaneous reports referred to the "browning" of the island, and the bark being stripped from trees.

After the storm, authorities estimated that it would take 6 months to restore public electricity to the entire country; an estimate which proved largely accurate.

Availability of food, potable water, fuel and medicine were highly limited. Residents had to queue, sometimes for hours, in the sun to obtain necessities. None of the banks functioned for several days afterwards, and the Territory became a purely cash economy for a period of weeks.

Homeless

Only 279 people were recorded as being provided emergency accommodation by the Government in the immediate aftermath. Although some unofficial estimates were higher, it was still a relatively small fraction of the overall population. Many of the surviving private dwellings were used to accommodate multiple families, which may have assisted the pressure on providing emergency accommodation.

Balsam Ghut prison

Following the hurricane there was extensive damage to the prison, 90% of the buildings were damaged, most had lost their roofs and the perimeter fence was breached at several points. Prisoners eventually forced their way out, some returning that day. Although exact numbers were never provided, the authorities indicated that a number of the prisoners surrendered themselves voluntarily after checking on their families. All except two of the remaining prisoners were subsequently recaptured over the following days. Joint operations by both UK and local police assisted by the Royal Marines secured the prison and returned the vast majority of prisoners within seven days.

High school
Irma damaged the Elmore Stoutt High School building, so students had to move to the former Clarence Thomas Ltd building in Pasea Estate. The students were divided into two shifts as the temporary building is not big enough to accommodate the students at the same time. Students in the morning shift are to go to after school programmes to keep themselves occupied.

Department of Disaster Management

The building which housed the Department of Disaster Management was almost totally destroyed in the storm. Accordingly, the relief and recovery efforts had to be coordinated from a conference room in Peebles Hospital.

Looting

In the days after the hurricane there were reports of looting of local businesses. This included not just food and medical supplies, but also non-essential consumer goods. The looting was brought under control when British troops arrived as part of the relief supplies.

Subsequent weather events

Four days after Hurricane Irma passed, Hurricane Jose, a Category 4 hurricane, narrowly missed the islands.

Eight days after Hurricane Irma passed, the Territory experienced torrential downpours of rain. Because the hills had been stripped of vegetation by the hurricane, this resulted almost immediately in extensive flooding of low-lying areas, including the capital, Road Town.

Fourteen days after Hurricane Irma, the Territory was struck again by Hurricane Maria, also a Category 5 hurricane. However the eye of the storm passed to the south of Saint Croix, and the damage was minimal compared to Hurricane Irma.

Relief efforts

By 8 September 2017, the UK government sent troops with medical supplies and other aid. The arrival of HMS Ocean, carrying more extensive assistance, was delayed and did not arrive for approximately two weeks.

After the hurricane passed, entrepreneur Sir Richard Branson, a resident of Necker Island, called on the UK government to develop a massive disaster recovery plan for British islands that were damaged, including "both through short-term aid and long-term infrastructure spending." Premier Orlando Smith also called for a comprehensive aid package to rebuild the BVI. On 10 September, British Prime Minister Theresa May pledged £32 million to the Caribbean region generally for a Hurricane relief fund.

Aid distribution centres were set up in Cane Garden Bay, East End and Hunthum's Ghut.

Evacuations

It took several days before Terrance B. Lettsome International Airport reopened for non-military traffic after the passage of the hurricane. Although it was only lightly damaged, communications equipment was destroyed, and the runway needed to be inspected and secured before allowing flight operations. In the seven days after it was reopened, a total of 1,597 (or approximately 5% of the population) was evacuated by airlift. The number of persons who evacuated by helicopter from private sites or by boat is not recorded.

Curfew

Almost immediately after the passage of the hurricane a state of emergency was declared and the Governor imposed a curfew. After one month, rather than extend the state of emergency, the Government passed the Curfew Act, giving the elected Government power to impose a curfew, which they did immediately. That civilian curfew then ended after a period of three months (after being gradually relaxed by degrees) and so the Territory operated under curfew for a period of three-months.

There are no reliable records of a curfew having been imposed in the Territory in modern times, and there was no legal basis upon which one could have been imposed (absent either legislation or a state of emergency). Therefore, this was likely the first curfew imposed in the British Virgin Islands since at least the colonial era.

Recovery

The estimated damage to property in the British Virgin Islands was initially calculated to be US$3.6 billion. Although there were widespread reports of economic distress and redundancies in the aftermath of the hurricane, no reliable statistics or projections have been published. In the Territory's 2018 annual budget address, the Minister of Finance reported a 46% decline in tourist arrivals, and projected a 9.3% decline in Government revenues, and a contraction of 2.6% in GDP.

Depopulation

In May 2018 the Immigration Department of the British Virgin Islands announced that the population of the Territory has dropped by approximately 11% since Hurricanes Irma and Maria struck the previous year.

Insurance

Recovery and rebuilding efforts in the Territory were hampered by low levels of insurance coverage. The Government itself had a policy of "self-insurance", and other than the Central Administration Complex, virtually none of its buildings or vehicles were insured.

Private homeowners also have relatively low levels of hurricane insurance. In previous natural disasters the Government has provided emergency assistance to residents, providing funding for repairs to homes that are uninsured. This created a moral hazard in that only uninsured homes were eligible for Government assistance, and incentivised lower income property owners to be underinsured or completely uninsured.

To assist insured homeowners, the Government formed a temporary dedicated Insurance Tribunal to hear and determine insurance claims.

References

Hurricane Irma
2017 in the British Virgin Islands
Irma
Irma